The Abulog River or Abulug River is the 9th largest river system in the Philippines in terms of watershed size. More than 90% of the drainage area of the river is located in Apayao province while the remaining, including the mouth of the river, is in Cagayan province.

The upper reaches of the Abulug River, especially upstream from Kabugao, is commonly known as the Apayao River.

References 

Rivers of the Philippines
Landforms of Cagayan
Landforms of Apayao